Joe Douglass (born January 21, 1974) is a former American football wide receiver/linebacker. He most recently played for the Las Vegas Gladiators in the Arena Football League.

High school career
At South Salem High School, Douglass rushed for 2,177 yards as a senior.

College career
At the University of Montana he was a student of Chris Bernuth, who taught performance enhancement.

Professional career
Douglass re-signed with the Chicago Rush on March 21, 2002.

References

External links
Profile from arenafootball.com
Stats from arenafan.com

1974 births
Living people
Sportspeople from Salem, Oregon
American football wide receivers
American football linebackers
Oregon State Beavers football players
Montana Grizzlies football players
Amsterdam Admirals players
Orlando Predators players
Chicago Rush players
Colorado Crush players
Los Angeles Avengers players
Las Vegas Gladiators players
South Salem High School alumni
Players of American football from Oregon